Justin Bonomo (born September 30, 1985) (known online as ZeeJustin) is an American high-stakes professional poker player, and a former Magic the Gathering competitor. He became the youngest player to be featured at a televised final table on February 19, 2005, when he placed fourth during the inaugural year of the EPT at the French Open in Deauville, France. He was 19 at the time.

As of July 2022 he has live tournament earnings of $57,283,047. this total makes him the highest-earning live tournament player of all time.

At the World Series of Poker, Bonomo has 55 cashes, made 19 final tables, and won 3 bracelets and 1 circuit ring for $14,292,554 in winnings. His first bracelet came in 2014 in Event #11: No-Limit Hold'em Six Handed, earning $449,980. He came in second in the previous event in which he played, Event #5: Limit 2-7 Triple Draw Lowball. This was his third runner-up finish after which he lamented on Twitter, “Always a bride’s maid, never a bride.” At the 2018 WSOP, Bonomo won Event #16, the $10,000 Heads-Up No-Limit Hold'em Championship with a prize of $185,965. He followed this up by winning Event #78, the $1,000,000 One Drop for $10,000,000. With this victory, he temporarily overtook Daniel Negreanu as number 1 on the all time live tournament money list, until being surpassed by Bryn Kenney in August 2019 then surpassing Bryn Kenney again in July 2022.

World Series of Poker

Super High Rollers

Justin Bonomo is a regular face on the High Roller circuit. He has won events such as the Triton High Roller Series, PokerStars Caribbean Adventure, Super High Roller Bowls in China and Las Vegas, and is a regular at the ARIA High Roller Events.

Online poker

Bonomo was caught entering major online poker tournaments using multiple accounts in 2006 on Partypoker. He was banned from 2 sites and tens of thousands of dollars were seized.

Bonomo was a sponsored member of Team Bodog until January 2010.

In 2011, he was accused of account sharing with his friend Isaac Haxton by Prahlad Friedman. They have both vehemently denied the accusation.

Personal life
Justin Bonomo lives in Las Vegas in the Panorama Towers, residence to more than 70 professional poker players. He is originally from Fairfax, Virginia.

Bonomo practices polyamory.

He donated $13,250 to the SENS project, a life extension research project.

References

1985 births
American poker players
World Series of Poker bracelet winners
World Series of Poker Circuit event winners
Living people
Polyamorous people